

France
 Afars and Issas
 Commissioner – Camille d'Ornano, High Commissioner of the Afars and Issas (1976–1977)
 Governing Council – Abdallah Mohamed Kamil, President of the Governing Council (1976–1977)
 Territory granted independence as Djibouti, 27 June

United Kingdom
 Ellice Islands
 Commissioner – Thomas Laying, Commissioner of Ellice Island (1975–1978)
 Prime Minister – Toaripi Lauti, Chief Minister of Ellice Islands (1975–1978)
 Hong Kong
Governor – Lord MacLehose of Beoch, Governor of Hong Kong, (1971–1982)

United States
 Guam
 Governor – Ricardo Bordallo, Governor of Guam (1975–1979)

Colonial governors
Colonial governors
1977